Several film directors have appeared in their own films, sometimes with an uncredited cameo, in a small walk-on role, or sometimes in a more major role. The following lists directors who have appeared in their own films.

Directors who regularly appear in their own films 

F. Gary Gray has made many appearances in the films he's directed including Friday, Set It Off, Law Abiding Citizen, and Straight Outta Compton. 

 Charlie Chaplin has appeared in many of his films including The Great Dictator, Twenty Minutes of Love, Caught in the Rain, A Busy Day, Her Friend the Bandit, Mabel's Married Life, Laughing Gas, Triple Trouble, His New Job, A Night Out, The Champion, In the Park, A Jitney Elopement, The Tramp, By the Sea, Work, A Woman, The Bank and many others
 Alfred Hitchcock had appeared (often very briefly) and made cameo appearances in nearly all of his films. See List of Alfred Hitchcock cameo appearances
 Hassan al-Imam had appeared (often very briefly) and made cameo appearances in nearly all of his films.
 Martin Scorsese has appeared in a fair number of his films
 Spike Lee has appeared in many of his early films including She's Gotta Have It, School Daze,  Do the Right Thing, Mo' Better Blues, Jungle Fever, and Girl 6
 Quentin Tarantino, has had both prominent roles (Reservoir Dogs, Pulp Fiction, Grindhouse, Django Unchained) and smaller roles (Jackie Brown, uncredited voice only)
 Woody Allen has appeared as the protagonist in many of his films
 Dodo Abashidze in his films such as The Legend of Suram Fortress and Ashik Kerib
 Gautam Vasudev Menon regularly played cameo roles in almost all of his films including Vinnaithaandi Varuvaayaa and Vaaranam Aayiram
 Dev Anand regularly starred in or at least had a major role in most of his films
 Kenneth Branagh has starred in and directed many films
 Tinto Brass appears in almost all his films
 Mel Brooks has had prominent roles in most of his films
 Jan Bucquoy has appeared in many of his films
 James Cameron very briefly appeared in Titanic, as Leonardo DiCaprio's artist hands and as a bystander in the third-class dance sequence
 John Carpenter has had small roles in many of his films, as well as composing the score for several
 John Cassavetes in his films such as Opening Night
 Wes Craven has appeared in cameos in a few of his films. Including a supporting role in Wes Craven's New Nightmare and cameos in Red Eye, Scream, Scream 2, Scream 3, and a deleted scene cameo in Scream 4
 William Dear has appeared in several films he has directed. His wife Susan and their son Oliver, now a director, has appeared in his productions
 Ruggero Deodato makes very brief cameos in most of his films
 Rainer Werner Fassbinder in his films such as Love Is Colder Than Death, Katzelmacher, Gods of the Plague, The American Soldier, Beware of a Holy Whore, Ali: Fear Eats the Soul, The Marriage of Maria Braun, and Veronika Voss
 Lucio Fulci appeared in several of his later films, and even had a starring role in one of them
 Subhash Ghai has appeared in many of his films
 Christopher Guest has prominent roles in many of his "mockumentaries"
 Peter Jackson has made small cameo appearances in most of his films
 Terry Jones directed and appeared in all Monty Python films, as well as The Wind In The Willows, where he played Mr. Toad
 Buster Keaton regularly appeared in his own films
 Abbas Kiarostami appeared in his film Taste of Cherry
 Takeshi Kitano appears in almost all his films
 Fritz Lang made appearances in most of his films
 Jørgen Leth in his films such as The Five Obstructions
 Michael Moore has starred in his own films
 Tom Noonan in his films such as The Wife
 Perarasu has made cameo appearances in all of his films to date
 Tyler Perry has so far regularly starred in or at least had a major role in all but three of his films
 Roman Polanski has regularly appeared in his films, in both major and smaller roles
 S.S. Rajamouli, regularly appears in his films
 K. S. Ravikumar makes a special appearance or sometimes appears in a supporting role in all his films
 Jean Renoir in his films such as The Rules of the Game
 Robert Rodriguez makes small cameo appearances in most of his films. His most concealed role would be in the opening scene of The Adventures of Sharkboy and Lavagirl, voicing a shark; most noticeable are in Sin City, where he played a member of the SWAT and in Sin City: A Dame to Kill For where he appears alongside Frank Miller in a film-noir movie on a TV
 Eli Roth has a small role in every film he has directed. In the latest Hostel film, only his severed head is in it
 Eldar Ryazanov has had small roles in many of his films
 John Sayles has appeared in many of his films
 Lowell Sherman normally an actor, Sherman began directing when sound arrived. From there he also appeared in productions he directed
 Daryush Shokof has appeared in at least 4 of his films
 M. Night Shyamalan has so far had a small role in all but three of his films (Wide Awake, After Earth,  and The Visit). His role in 2008's The Happening was his most concealed to date. (He was the voice on the phone that Zooey Deschanel was talking to throughout the film)
 Vilgot Sjöman in his films such as I Am Curious (Yellow) and I Am Curious (Blue)
 Kevin Smith, as the character Silent Bob in all of the View Askewniverse films
 Jacques Tati makes multiple appearances in his films as a character named Monsieur Hulot
 Chris Tashima played the lead in Visas and Virtue and played the storyteller character in Day of Independence
 Eric von Stroheim, famously appeared in his lengthy silent film epics i.e. Blind Husbands and Foolish Wives
 Lars von Trier in his films such as The Element of Crime, Europa, and The Five Obstructions
 John Waters has had roles of varying prominence in most of his films
 Orson Welles had roles of varying significance in every film he directed
 Edgar Wright appears briefly in both Shaun of the Dead and Hot Fuzz
 Lydia Zimmermann in her films such as Aro Tolbukhin. En la mente del asesino
 Taika Waititi has appeared in roles of varying significance in feature films he has directed

Actors who have directed and starred in their own films 

 Woody Allen in Take the Money and Run, Bananas, Everything You Always Wanted to Know About Sex* (*But Were Afraid to Ask), Sleeper, Love and Death, Annie Hall, Manhattan, Stardust Memories, A Midsummer Night's Sex Comedy, Zelig, Broadway Danny Rose, Hannah and Her Sisters, New York Stories, Crimes and Misdemeanors, Shadows and Fog, Husbands and Wives, Manhattan Murder Mystery, Don't Drink the Water, Mighty Aphrodite, Everyone Says I Love You, Deconstructing Harry, Small Time Crooks, The Curse of the Jade Scorpion, Hollywood Ending, Scoop and To Rome with Love
 Alan Alda in The Four Seasons, Sweet Liberty, A New Life and Betsy's Wedding
 Cüneyt Arkın in all the films he directed
 Ben Affleck in The Town, Argo, and Live by Night
 Bobcat Goldthwait in Shakes the Clown and World's Greatest Dad
 Warren Beatty in Heaven Can Wait, Reds, Dick Tracy and Bulworth
 Richard Pryor in Jo Jo Dancer, Your Life Is Calling
 Roberto Benigni in Life Is Beautiful, The Tiger and the Snow
 Radha Blank in The Forty-Year-Old Version
 Matthew Broderick in Infinity
 Mel Brooks in Silent Movie, High Anxiety, History of the World Part I, Spaceballs, Life Stinks, and Dracula: Dead and Loving It
 Nicolas Cage in Sonny
 Charlie Chaplin starred in almost every film he directed
 Cheran in Autograph, Thavamai Thavamirundhu and Mayakannadi
Tommy Chong in Cheech and Chong's Next Movie, Nice Dreams, Still Smokin, Cheech & Chong's The Corsican Brothers, and Far Out Man
 George Clooney in Confessions of a Dangerous Mind, Good Night, and Good Luck, Leatherheads, The Ides of March, The Monuments Men, and The Midnight Sky
 Bradley Cooper in A Star is Born
 Kevin Costner in Dances with Wolves, The Postman and Open Range
 Billy Crystal in Mr. Saturday Night and Forget Paris
 Johnny Depp in The Brave
 Danny DeVito in Throw Momma from the Train, The War of the Roses, Hoffa, Matilda and Death to Smoochy
 Kirk Douglas in Scalawag and Posse
 Robert Duvall in The Apostle
 Clint Eastwood in A Perfect World, Million Dollar Baby, Gran Torino, Absolute Power, Bronco Billy, The Eiger Sanction, Firefox, The Gauntlet, High Plains Drifter, The Outlaw Josey Wales, Pale Rider, Play Misty for Me, Space Cowboys, Sudden Impact, True Crime, Unforgiven, The Bridges of Madison County, Honkytonk Man, Heartbreak Ridge, White Hunter Black Heart, The Rookie, Blood Work, The Mule, and Cry Macho
 Ralph Fiennes in Coriolanus
 Jodie Foster in Little Man Tate and The Beaver
 Jonathan Frakes in Star Trek: First Contact and Star Trek: Insurrection
 Mel Gibson in The Man Without a Face and Braveheart
 Crispin Glover in What Is It?
 Kamal Haasan in Hey Ram and Virumaandi
 Tom Hanks in That Thing You Do and Larry Crowne
 Ayhan Işık in Örgün
 Ed Harris in Pollock and Appaloosa
 Charlton Heston in Antony and Cleopatra, Mother Lode and A Man for All Seasons
 Dennis Hopper in Easy Rider, The Last Movie, Out of the Blue
 Michael Jackson in Moonwalker
 Alejandro Jodorowsky in El Topo and The Holy Mountain
 John Krasinski in A Quiet Place
 Bruce Lee in Way of the Dragon
Jerry Lewis in The Bellboy, The Ladies Man, The Errand Boy, The Nutty Professor (1963 film), The Patsy (1964 film), The Family Jewels (film), Hardly Working, and Cracking Up (1983 film)
 Ida Lupino in The Bigamist
 Diana Lee Inosanto in The Sensei
 Angelina Jolie in By the Sea
 Terry Jones in Monty Python and the Holy Grail, Monty Python's Life of Brian, Monty Python's The Meaning of Life, Erik the Viking, and The Wind in the Willows
 Tommy Lee Jones in The Three Burials of Melquiades Estrada
 Buster Keaton starred in all but three of the films he directed
 Diane Keaton in Hanging Up
 Aamir Khan in Taare Zameen Par
 Eric Allan Kramer and Leigh-Allyn Baker in Good Luck Charlie
 Seth MacFarlane in Ted and A Million Ways to Die in the West
 Cheech Marin in Born in East L.A
 Coco Martin in Ang Panday (2017). Director role credited as Rodel Nacianceno, Martin's real name.
 Melanie Martinez in K-12
 Walter Matthau in Gangster Story
 Balachandra Menon in all the films he directed
 Nikita Mikhalkov in At Home Among Strangers, A Slave of Love, An Unfinished Piece for a Player Piano, Burnt by the Sun, The Barber of Siberia, 12, Burnt by the Sun 2
 Robert Montgomery in Lady in the Lake, Ride the Pink Horse, Once More My Darling and Your Witness
 Bill Murray in Quick Change
 Leonard Nimoy in Star Trek III: The Search for Spock and Star Trek IV: The Voyage Home
 Jack Nicholson in Goin' South, The Terror and The Two Jakes
 Laurence Olivier in Henry V, Hamlet, Richard III, and The Prince and the Showgirl
 Anthony Perkins in Psycho III, Lucky Stiff
 Tyler Perry in all of his films so far except Daddy's Little Girls, Acrimony, For Colored Girls and Temptation: Confessions of a Marriage Counselor
 Irving Pichel in Santa Fe and Martin Luther
 Prince in Under The Cherry Moon
 Gregory Ratoff in Abdullah the Great
 Robert Redford in The Horse Whisperer and Lions for Lambs
 Rob Reiner in This Is Spinal Tap, Misery, The Story of Us and Alex and Emma
Isabel Sandoval in Señorita (2011) and Lingua Franca
 George C. Scott in Rage (1972)
 William Shatner in Star Trek V: The Final Frontier and Groom Lake
 Frank Sinatra in None but the Brave
 Gary Sinise in Of Mice and Men
 Martin Sheen in Cadence
 Sylvester Stallone in Paradise Alley, Rocky II, Rocky III, Rocky IV and Rocky Balboa, Rambo and The Expendables 
 Ben Stiller in Reality Bites, The Cable Guy, Zoolander, Tropic Thunder, and The Secret Life of Walter Mitty
 Barbra Streisand in Yentl, The Prince of Tides and The Mirror Has Two Faces
 S. J. Suryah in New, Anbe Aaruyire and Isai
 Billy Bob Thornton in Sling Blade and Daddy and Them
 François Truffaut in The Wild Child, Day for Night and The Green Room
 Keenan Ivory Wayans in I'm Gonna Git You Sucka and A Low Down Dirty Shame
 Raj Kapoor in almost all films he directed
 Tom Cavanagh in Tom & Grant
 Robert De Niro in A Bronx Tale and The Good Shepherd
 Lake Bell in In a World...
 Zach Braff in Garden State and Wish I Was Here
 Jon Favreau in Chef
 Brie Larson in Unicorn Store
 Roman Polanski in The Tenant
Cheryl Dunye in The Watermelon Woman
 Sunny Deol in Ghayal: Once Again
Ajay Devgn in U Me Aur Hum and Shivaay
 Nadine Labaki in Caramel, Where Do We Go Now and Capernaum
Takeshi Kitano in Violent Cop, Boiling Point, Sonatine, Getting Any?, Fireworks, Kikujiro, Brother, Zatoichi, Takeshis', Glory to the Filmmaker!, Achilles and the Tortoise, Outrage, Beyond Outrage, and Outrage Coda. Actor Credited Role As Beat Takeshi
 Ernest Prakasa in Ngenest, Check the Store Next Door, Susah Sinyal, Imperfect, and Check the Store Next Door 2
 Lee Jung-jae in Hunt
 Denzel Washington in Antwone Fisher (film), The Great Debaters, and Fences (film)
 Jiang Wen in Devils on the Doorstep, The Sun Also Rises, Let the Bullets Fly, Gone with the Bullets, and Hidden Man

Directors who have occasionally cameoed in their own films 

 Kevin Allen in Twin Town
 Emile Ardolino in Dirty Dancing
 Eli Craig in Tucker & Dale vs. Evil
 Michael Bay in Armageddon, Bad Boys II and Transformers
 Luc Besson in L'Avant dernier, Subway, The Big Blue and in animated form in Arthur and the Minimoys
 Madhur Bhandarkar appears in his movie fashion, apparently researching on the same movie.
 Tod Browning in Dracula 
 Tim Burton in Miss Peregrine's Home for Peculiar Children (film) and Pee-wee's Big Adventure
 Frank Capra in It Happened One Night
 Rob Cohen in Dragon: The Bruce Lee Story, Daylight, The Skulls, The Fast and the Furious and XXX
 Telugu director, S.S. Rajamouli has appeared as a stall owner in the 2015 Telugu industry hit Baahubali: The Beginning
 John Cromwell in Abe Lincoln in Illinois
 Wes Craven in the first four Scream films and New Nightmare
 Alfonso Cuarón in Harry Potter and the Prisoner of Azkaban
 Richard Curtis in Love Actually as a trombonist at a wedding.
 Cecil B. DeMille in The Squaw Man
 Richard Donner in Superman, Superman II, Superman II: The Richard Donner Cut, The Goonies, Conspiracy Theory, Timeline and 16 Blocks
 Jon Favreau in Elf, Made,  Iron Man, and Iron Man 2
 Terry Gilliam in Monty Python and the Holy Grail, Jabberwocky, The Crimson Permanent Assurance, Brazil and The Adventures of Baron Munchausen
 Jean-Luc Godard appears as the bystander who betrays Jean-Paul Belmondo in Breathless (1960).
 Renny Harlin in Deep Blue Sea
 Ron Howard in Night Shift kissing a girl outside of Henry Winkler's apartment.
 John Hughes in The Breakfast Club, Ferris Bueller's Day Off, and National Lampoon's Class Reunion.
 John Huston in The Treasure of the Sierra Madre
 Peter R. Hunt's reflection appears in the Universal Exports sign in On Her Majesty's Secret Service
 Shekhar Kapur in Bandit Queen as a lorry driver.
 Stanley Kubrick briefly appeared in his final film, Eyes Wide Shut. He also had a small voice role in his penultimate film, Full Metal Jacket.
 John Landis in Schlock, The Kentucky Fried Movie, The Blues Brothers and An American Werewolf in London
 Richard Linklater in It's Impossible to Learn to Plow by Reading Books, Slacker and Waking Life
 George Lucas in Star Wars: Episode III – Revenge of the Sith
 David Lynch in The Amputee, Dune, Twin Peaks: Fire Walk with Me and Dumb Land (voice only)
 George Marshall in Pack Up Your Troubles 
 Gautham Vasudev Menon in Minnale, Kaaka Kaaka, Vettaiyaadu Vilaiyaadu, Pachaikili Muthucharam and Vaaranam Aayiram
 Mike Newell in Harry Potter and the Goblet of Fire
 Todd Phillips in Road Trip, Old School, and The Hangover
Judd Apatow as a customer in a deleted scene of The 40 Year Old Virgin. Apatow also appears with his daughters in a scene.
 Sydney Pollack in The Electric Horseman, Tootsie, Random Hearts and The Interpreter
 Michael Powell in Peeping Tom as the sadistic scientist father (only seen in home-movie footage). Also seen briefly in Hotel Splendide, The Fire Raisers, The Edge of the World, One of Our Aircraft Is Missing, The Volunteer
 Robert Rafelson in the Monkees' feature film, Head
 Sam Raimi had a cameo in The Evil Dead as one of the roadside people waving goodbye to Ash and his friends. Also seen briefly in Evil Dead II and Army of Darkness
 Harold Ramis as the neurologist in Groundhog Day
 Raúl Ruiz in Colloque de chiens, Las soledades, Cofralandes, Chilean Rhapsody, La Recta Provincia and Ballet aquatique
 Joe Russo in Captain America: The Winter Soldier, Captain America: Civil War, Avengers: Infinity War (scene deleted), and Avengers: Endgame
 Martin Scorsese in Taxi Driver, Raging Bull, The King of Comedy, After Hours, The Age of Innocence and Hugo. (Some of these are offscreen voice roles, but he had a significant speaking part in Taxi Driver.)
 Daryush Shokof as the thief in Venussian tabutasco, as the nose in all women film Breathful and was the chief detective in A2Z
 Steven Spielberg in Jaws, Indiana Jones and the Temple of Doom and The Lost World: Jurassic Park
 Oliver Stone in The Hand, Platoon, Wall Street, Born on the Fourth of July, The Doors, Nixon (voice only), Any Given Sunday and Wall Street: Money Never Sleeps
 Gus Van Sant in My Own Private Idaho, Psycho, Finding Forrester and Last Days
 David Yates in Harry Potter and the Order of the Phoenix
 David Zucker and Jerry Zucker in Airplane!
 Chris Columbus in his film adaptation of musical Rent.
 John Woo in A Better Tomorrow
 Remo D'Souza in ABCD 2
 Zack Snyder in Dawn of the Dead, Watchmen, Batman v Superman: Dawn of Justice, and Justice League
 Stephen Surjik in Wayne's World 2

See also 
 List of Alfred Hitchcock cameo appearances

References 

Lists of film directors